Piarere is a locality in the Waikato region of New Zealand's North Island. It is situated on State Highway 29 close to its junction with State Highway 1, close to the shore of Lake Karapiro. The nearest towns are Tīrau, six kilometres to the southeast, Matamata, 10 kilometres to the northeast, and Cambridge, 10 kilometres to the northwest.

The meaning of the settlement's name is uncertain, as piarere may be translated from Māori in numerous ways, but it is possibly a personal name.

The Hinuera Gap, a geological feature stretching northeast of Piarere, was in prehistoric times the path of the Waikato River, which had its outlet in the Firth of Thames. The river's course was altered to its current outflow by the massive eruption of Lake Taupo 25,000 years ago.

References

South Waikato District
Populated places in Waikato
Populated places on the Waikato River